Qureshi (also known as Qureyshi, Quraishi, Qurayshi, Qureshy, Quraishy, Qoraishi, Qoreshi, Koraishi, Kureshi, Kureshy, Kureishi, Coreish) is a Muslim family name. In English it has many spellings, in Arabic it is spelled "", which means part of the Quraish Family. The title is associated with the family of Muhammad.

It is a common surname in South Asia and parts of Western Asia, particularly the Arabian peninsula. Most bearers of the name, by far, are in Pakistan (82%: 1,210,000, out of 1,470,000 worldwide), where it is the ninth most common surname. India has the second most (11%: 162,000), followed by Saudi Arabia (2.5%: 36,300), England (0.65%: 9,580) and Iran.

History 
The Quraish at first opposed Muhammad's teachings and is said to have persecuted him and his followers, but by the time of his death they had begun to convert to the new faith and played an important role in bringing Arabia to Islam.

According to M Naushad Ansari, who is director of the Centre for Dissemination of Universal Message, New Delhi, "Nevertheless, of late, some of these Muslim caste groups became organized and have given themselves Muslim nomenclatures. They identified and associated themselves with Islamic personalities. For example, the Qasai or Qasab or butchers designated themselves as Qureshi; the weavers as Ansari.

References 

Arabic-language surnames
Pakistani names
Indian surnames